The National Emergency Services Museum is a museum in Sheffield, England. Opened on 8 May 1984 as the Sheffield Fire and Police Museum, it was given its present name on 1 January 2014.

Building
The museum is based at a former combined police and fire station, opened in 1900 at the junction of West Bar and Tenter Street near the city centre.  A notable feature is one of the few remaining Fire Brigade observation towers in the United Kingdom. Others include the headquarters of Liverpool Fire Brigade at Hatton Garden, Liverpool, and the now-closed Woolwich Fire Station.

Collection
The museum's collection covers law and order, and social history. The museum is a Registered Charity (1161866) run by volunteers, and is open on Wednesday to Sunday 10 - 4.

Gallery

References

External links 

 Museum website

Museums established in 1984
Museums in Sheffield
Grade II listed buildings in Sheffield
Fire stations in the United Kingdom
Fire lookout towers
Police stations
Law enforcement museums in England
History museums in South Yorkshire
Local museums in South Yorkshire
Firefighting museums in England
1984 establishments in England